Liu Guilan (born 12 February 1971) is a Chinese biathlete. She competed at the 1992 Winter Olympics and the 1994 Winter Olympics.

References

1971 births
Living people
Biathletes at the 1992 Winter Olympics
Biathletes at the 1994 Winter Olympics
Chinese female biathletes
Olympic biathletes of China
Place of birth missing (living people)